US Post Office-Rye is a historic post office building located at Rye in Westchester County, New York, United States. It was built in 1935 and designed by the Office of the Supervising Architect under the direction of Louis A. Simon.  It is a one-story symmetrical flat roofed building in the Colonial Revival style.  The front facade features a central, recessed entrance with broad limestone surround and shallow decorated cornice.  The lobby features a mural by Guy Pene du Bois painted in 1938 and titled "John Jay at His Home."

It was listed on the National Register of Historic Places in 1989.

The building was renamed the Caroline O'Day Post Office on October 23, 2010 in recognition of Congresswoman Caroline O'Day's public service.

See also
National Register of Historic Places listings in southern Westchester County, New York

References

Rye
Government buildings completed in 1935
Colonial Revival architecture in New York (state)
Buildings and structures in Westchester County, New York
Buildings and structures in Rye, New York
National Register of Historic Places in Westchester County, New York